Burrough is a surname. Notable people with the surname include:

 Bryan Burrough (b. 1961), American author and magazine correspondent
 Edward Burrough (1634–1663), English Quaker leader and controversialist
 Harold Burrough (1889–1977), British naval officer
 James Burrough (disambiguation), more than one person with the name
 John Burrough (disambiguation), more than one person with the name
 Ken Burrough (1948-2022), American football player
 William Burrough (disambiguation), more than one person with the name

See also
 Burroughs (surname)
 Burrow (surname)